The 1970 Pittsburgh Panthers football team represented the University of Pittsburgh in the 1970 NCAA University Division football season. The team compiled a 5–5 record in its second year under head coach Carl DePasqua, their best record since their #4 ranked 9-1 1963 squad. The team's statistical leaders included John Hogan with 801 passing yards and Tony Esposito with 623 rushing yards.

Schedule

Roster

References

Pittsburgh
Pittsburgh Panthers football seasons
Pittsburgh Panthers football